Painted Post station is a historic railway station at Painted Post in Steuben County, New York.  It was constructed in 1881–1882 as a passenger and freight depot for the Delaware, Lackawanna & Western Railroad.

It was listed on the National Register of Historic Places in 1991 as the Delaware, Lackawanna & Western Railroad Station.

The depot is used as the Painted Post-Erwin Museum at the Depot, a museum of local history that is operated by the Corning-Painted Post Historical Society.

The Society also operates the Benjamin Patterson Inn, an early 19th-century period tavern in Corning, New York.

References

External links
 Painted Post-Erwin Museum at the Depot - Corning-Painted Post Historical Society

Railway stations on the National Register of Historic Places in New York (state)
Gothic Revival architecture in New York (state)
Italianate architecture in New York (state)
Railway stations in the United States opened in 1882
Buildings and structures in Steuben County, New York
Transportation in Steuben County, New York
Painted Post, New York
Museums in Steuben County, New York
History museums in New York (state)
National Register of Historic Places in Steuben County, New York
Former railway stations in New York (state)